Saratovka is a rural locality (a selo) in Tarbagataysky District, Republic of Buryatia, Russia. The population was 210 as of 2010. There is 1 street.

Geography 
Saratovka is located 22 km north of Tarbagatay (the district's administrative centre) by road. Selenga is the nearest rural locality.

References 

Rural localities in Tarbagataysky District